Scarborough—Ellesmere was a provincial riding in Ontario, Canada. It was created prior to the 1975 provincial election and eliminated in 1996, when its territory was incorporated into the riding of Scarborough Centre. Scarborough—Ellesmere riding was created from parts of the former ridings of Scarborough North, Scarborough West and Scarborough Centre. It was in the former borough of Scarborough.

Four Members of Provincial Parliament represented the riding during its history. The most notable was David Warner who served as Speaker of the Legislature from 1990 to 1995.

Boundaries
Scarborough—Ellesmere occupied the west central part of Scarborough. From its southwest corner it went north along Victoria Park Avenue to Lawrence Avenue East. East to Birchmount Road and then north to Highway 401. It turned east and followed the 401 to Markham Road. South from this point along Markham to Ellesmere Road and then east to Scarborough Golf Club Road. It went south to Lawrence Avenue East and then turned back west along Lawrence to Midland Avenue where it jogged south to Eglinton Avenue East. It then followed Eglinton west to back to Victoria Park Avenue.

Members of Provincial Parliament

Electoral results

1975 boundaries

1987 boundaries

References

Notes

Citations

Former provincial electoral districts of Ontario
Provincial electoral districts of Toronto
Scarborough, Toronto